Does the Cosmic Shepherd Dream of Electric Tapirs? is an album by the Acid Mothers Temple & The Melting Paraiso U.F.O., released in 2004. The title is a reference to the Philip K. Dick novel, Do Androids Dream of Electric Sheep?.

The album was recorded at Acid Mothers Temple from May 2002 up to January 2003.

Track listing
 "Daddy's Bare Meat" - 8:20  	
 "Suzie Sixteen" - 4:36 	
 "Hello Good Child" - 8:01 	
 "The Assassin's Beautiful Daughter" - 9:02 	
 "Dark Star Blues" - 25:13 	
 "The Transmigration Of Hop Heads" - 18:25

References

Acid Mothers Temple albums
2004 albums